Teletrac (branded as Teletrac Navman; formerly Trafficmaster) is a software as a service company headquartered in Southern California, with offices in the United Kingdom. It provides cloud-based GPS fleet tracking software, stolen vehicle tracking and connected services such as eCall, bCall and Concierge and is a subsidiary of Vontier.

History
Teletrac was founded as International Teletrac Systems in 1988. It received initial funding from a unit of AirTouch Communication (formerly known as Pacific Telesis) in exchange for 49% equity of the company. Teletrac launched two service offerings in 1990 for its flagship Los Angeles market: a consumer service called "Stolen Vehicle Location Services" and a fleet/enterprise service called "Corporate Vehicle Location services". Los Angeles was followed by Detroit, Miami, Dallas, Chicago, and Houston.

In 1991, following the lifting of information services restrictions from the AT&T consent decree, AirTouch increased its equity stake and the company became known as AirTouch Teletrac.

Teletrac was purchased from Airtouch in 1996 by James McQueen and its headquarters were moved to Kansas City.

Trafficmaster
Founded in the United Kingdom in 1988 by entrepreneurs David Martell and Ian Williams, Trafficmaster provided road congestion information to drivers, using a network of sensors on major roads. The company was floated on the London Stock Exchange in 1994 and expanded into Germany and other countries; it added fleet management and stolen vehicle tracking to its services. By 2000, during the dot.com bubble, the company was valued at £650 million and had partnerships with several car manufacturers.

In 2001, Trafficmaster purchased Teletrac in order to expand into the United States. The Teletrac brand was retained for the subsidiary. In early 2002, the company pulled out of the fleet management market in Europe after issuing two profit warnings.

Vector Capital
Trafficmaster plc was purchased by private equity firm Vector Capital in 2010, in a deal valued at $145 million. The company was taken private after the purchase. Prior to the purchase, the bulk of Trafficmaster's income came from its operations in the United States.

Danaher / Fortive / Vontier
In 2013, Vector Capital sold Teletrac to American conglomerate Danaher Corporation; it was reported that Vector made three-times return with the sale. Teletrac was among the businesses spun off in 2016 to create Fortive, and in 2020 Fortive split out its transportation businesses to create Vontier.

Navman
Teletrac merged in 2015 with Taiwan-owned Navman Wireless, a maker of GPS navigation devices, and the resulting company was headquartered in Glenview, IL.

In 2016, the company rebranded as Teletrac Navman and the UK company was renamed from Trafficmaster Limited to Teletrac Navman (UK) Ltd.

Products
The company's initial product was stolen vehicle location and corporate fleet vehicle location, using a technique called Time Difference of Arrival (TDoA) Multilateration. Specialized base stations and receivers were installed throughout a city, and vehicles equipped with special transmitters could have their location determined on command. Once GPS receivers became affordable, Teletrac discontinued its network-based positioning system and began marketing products and services centered around a cloud-based GPS tracking platform. It has been used for numerous purposes over the years including tracking stolen vehicles and monitoring fuel consumption. The software platform has built-in capabilities that track for compliance with EOBR and FMCSA. The software can be used for basic GPS vehicle tracking as well as compliance with electronic driver logs. Its capabilities allow for the tracking of a few vehicles or a fleet of vehicles for larger companies.

Teletrac Navman diversified into connected services in 2020, providing cloud based TCU connectivity to brands in the UK, Europe, United States and Australasia such as Ford, Jaguar and Land Rover.

References

Software companies established in 1988
Software companies based in California
Companies based in Orange County, California
1988 establishments in California
2010 mergers and acquisitions
2013 mergers and acquisitions
Software companies of the United States